The Ghaṭafān were an Arab tribal confederation originally based northeast of Medina. The main branches of the Ghatafan were the tribes of Banu Abs, Banu Dhubyan and Ashja'. They were one of the Arab tribes that interacted with Muhammad. They are notable for allying themselves with the Quraysh in the Battle of the Trench.

Origins and branches
The Ghatafan were a Bedouin tribal grouping that inhabited the Wadi al-Rumma area of Najd between the Hejaz mountains and Jabal Shammar. According to Arab genealogical tradition, the progenitor of the tribe was Ghaṭafān ibn Saʾd ibn Qays ʿAylān, making it a part of the larger Qays tribe. The etymology or meaning of Ghatafan is not known.

The main branches of the Ghatafan were the following:
The Banu Ashja, who inhabited the westernmost area of the Ghatafan's tribal territory.
The Banu Dhubyan, who were descendants of Dhubyān ibn Baghīd ibn Rayth ibn Ghaṭafān. They inhabited the area east of the Banu Ashja and included the major subtribes of the Banu Murra, the Banu Fazara and the Tha’laba.
The Banu Abs, descendants of ʿAbs ibn Baghīd ibn Rayth ibn Ghaṭafān, inhabited the area east of the Banu Dhubyan.
The Anmar, who inhabited the Qassim region of Najd.

Conflict with Muhammad

They were involved in several military conflicts with Muhammad. The first was the Invasion of Dhi Amr occurred directly after the Invasion of Sawiq in the year 3 A.H of the Islamic calendar, September 624. The expedition was ordered by Muhammad after he received intelligence that the Banu Muharib and Banu Talabah tribes, were planning to raid the outskirts of Medina. Therefore, Muhammad launched a preemptive strike with 450 men.

Another conflict they were involved in was the Expedition of Dhat al-Riqa where Muhammad ordered an attack on the tribe because he received news that they were assembling at Dhat al-Riqa with a suspicious purpose.

This was followed by the Invasion of Dumatul Jandal. Muhammad ordered his men to invade Duma, because Muhammad received intelligence that some tribes there were involved in highway robbery and preparing to attack Medina itself This happened in July 626.

Then Expedition of Abu Qatadah ibn Rab'i al-Ansari (Khadirah) in November or Dec 629 the Expedition of Abu Qatadah ibn Rab'i al-Ansari (Khadirah)  took place. With the goal of attacking the Ghatafan tribe because he heard that they were amassing troops and were still outside the "domain of Islam"

List
Nuaym ibn Masud
 Banu Abs
 Bani Rasheed
 Rashaida people
 Mutayr

See also
List of expeditions of Muhammad

References

Bibliography

 
Tribes of Arabia
Tribes of Saudi Arabia
Muhammad in Medina